al-Ajlani is an Arabic surname. Notable people with the surname include:

Ahmad Al-Ajlani (born 1960), Tunisian footballer and manager
Munir al-Ajlani (died 2004), Syrian politician, lawyer, writer and scholar

See also
Ajlan

Arabic-language surnames